Sanpada is a railway station on the Harbour Line of the Mumbai Suburban Railway network. Sanpada has good railway connections with CST, Thane and Panvel.

References 

Railway stations in Thane district
Mumbai Suburban Railway stations
Mumbai CR railway division